The  was a unit of land measurement in the Spanish viceroyalties in the Americas during the times of the Spanish Empire in the 16th through 19th centuries Spanish West Indies. The unit, however, came from Spain, where it had already been in use.

History 
A decree of King Ferdinand V on 18 June 1513 is the first known law granting land in the Americas to Europeans. The decree dictated that conquered lands could be granted to Spanish soldier in two units: caballerías and peonias. The decree extended to the New World a system Castile had already been using for areas it conquered in Europe. The unit was over four times larger than a peonia.

Land grants measuring one or more  were issued to the members of the cavalry of a Spanish war company upon resulting victorious over a territory during a war conquest expedition, with the condition that once the soldier had decided to make his residence at such location, they committed themselves to the defense of the town where they were to reside.

Demise 
As open land became less available for granting by the Spanish Crown, and as portions of caballerías were segregated by their owners in sales transactions into smaller land units too small to be measured in caballerías and, thus, measured in the more convenient cuerda units, the use of caballería units started to become obsolete.

References

External links 
 Manufacturas en Michoacán.
 Metrología Equivalencias aproximadas.
 Feijoo Osorio, Carlos: Antiguas unidades de superficie.

Further reading
 Don Fernando V, Valladolid, Spain, 18 June and 9 August 1513. Chapter 1. 
 Emperor Don Carlos. 26 June 1523. Toledo, Spain. 19 May 1525. 
 Don Felipe II. Chapter titled "Instrucción". Toledo, Spain, 25 May 1596. Ordenanza 104, 105 and 106, "Poblaciones".

Units of measurement
Units of area